The 1986 Individual Speedway Junior European Championship was the tenth edition of the European motorcycle speedway Under-21 Championships. Held on 13 July in Rivne (now Ukraine), the winner was Igor Marko of the Soviet Union.

European final
13 July 1986
 Rivne, Rivne Speedway

References

1986
Individual Speedway
Individual Speedway
Speedway competitions in Russia